Buffalo Creek is a  tributary of the Appomattox River in the U.S. state of Virginia.  Flowing entirely through Prince Edward County, it joins the Appomattox River at Farmville.

See also
List of rivers of Virginia

References

Notes

USGS Hydrologic Unit Map - State of Virginia (1974)

Rivers of Virginia
Tributaries of the James River
Rivers of Prince Edward County, Virginia